Yu-Ti is a fictional character appearing in American comic books published by Marvel Comics.

Publication history
The Dragon Lord Yu-Ti first appeared in Marvel Premiere #15 (May 1974), and was created by Roy Thomas and Gil Kane. The character subsequently appears in Deadly Hands of Kung Fu #10 (March 1975), Marvel Premiere #22 (June 1975), Master of Kung Fu Annual #1 (1976), Deadly Hands of Kung Fu #21 (February 1976), Iron Fist #6-7 (August–September 1976), Marvel Team-Up #64 (December 1977), Power Man and Iron Fist #74-75 (October–November 1981), and Immortal Iron Fist #4-8 (May–October 2007), and #10-14 (December 2007-June 2008).

Fictional character biography
The Yu-Ti Lord Tuan and his son Nu-An dwelt in the shining tower of K'un-L'un looking over the peace of their realm and watching the other dimensions through the emerald Great Crystal. Lord Tuan and Nu-An wandered outside the city where they encounter Shou-Lao who prepared to attack them. Wendell Rand from Earth suddenly arrived on K'un-L'un and drove Shou-Lao away with a rifle.

Tuan adopted Wendell Rand into his house as his adopted son. Nu-An was present as the new Yu-Ti where he puts his arms around Wendell Rand showing him preference over Davos.

Wendell fell in love with Shakirah/Shakiri and ended up marrying her (and fathering a daughter named Miranda Rand). This ended up earning Wendell the enmity of the future Yu-Ti who was also in love with Shakirah.

Nu-An helped Wendell into preparing his uniform as he was readied for combat against Davos for the right to challenge Shou-Lao. Nu-An stood silently as Davos accused Lord Tuan of favoritism after he pronounced Wendell the winner. Nu-An also stood silently as Lord Tuan banished Davos from K'un-L'un for challenging Shou-Lao without his permission.

Nu-An watched alongside Tu-An and Lei Kung as Wendell Rand headed off to fight Shou-Lao.

Ten years after Wendell had saved Lord Tuan and Nu-An, Wendell returned to Earth as Nu-An watched.

As the Steel Serpent, Davos traveled to K'un-L'un on two separate occasions of its every ten year appearance on Earth. Both times, Davos has challenged Nu-An and lost.

When Lord Tuan died and became the first among the Yama Kings of Feng-Tu, his son Nu-An became the new Yu-Ti.

Nu-An later welcomed a 10-Year-Old Danny Rand to K'un-L'un granting him a rewarding stay and expressed his grief over Danny's parents. When Nu-An told Danny that he can have whatever he wanted, Danny told Nu-An that he wanted revenge. Nu-An told Danny that revenge is the one thing he can't give to Danny. He did offer to have Danny trained in the arts of Kung Fu.

When a Tibetan monk arrived in K'un-L'un, Nu-An showed him Danny Rand who was training under Lei Kung.

Nu-An spoke to Danny telling him that he must learn strategy because the greatest martial artists can be overcome by someone who can anticipate their moves.

After mastering many skills under Lei Kung, Danny Rand appeared before Nu-An who states that the training he had is not enough for him. In order to obtain the "Iron Fist" power, Danny took up Nu-An's offer which involved him slaying Shou-Lao.

Alongside the Dragon Kings, Nu-An asked Iron Fist if he was ready to be challenged to prove himself worthy of joining the company of the immortals. Alongside the Dragon Kings, Nu-An oversaw Iron Fist overcome the Challenge of the Many. Nu-An did advise Danny to take a pause before he takes on the Challenge of the One. Iron Fist stated that he was ready and ended up facing his opponent Shu-Hu. One of the Dragon Kings expressed doubt in Iron Fist as Nu-An remained silent as Iron Fist manages to defeat Shu-Hu. After the victory, Nu-An congratulated Iron Fist and offered him the right to choose between immortality or death.

Nu-An brought Iron Fist with him to the Tree of Immortality where Nu-An reminds him of the one day in every ten year connection between K'un-L'un and Earth with the next day being that day. Nu-An tells Iron Fist that he can either eat the fruit from the Tree of Immortality and live amongst K'un-L'un's inhabitants or to pass through the gates to Earth where he won't be able to return. Although Nu-An encouraged Iron Fist to eat the fruit, Iron Fist states that he still has a score to settle with Harold Meachum. Upon hearing Iron Fist's choice, Nu-An quotes "I know more than you can ever imagine Daniel. For Wendell Rand was not only your father, he was my brother." Nu-An was present as Iron Fist left for Earth the next morning.

Lei Kung later uses Nu-An's great crystal to observe Iron Fist's battle between Steel Serpent which ended in the seemingly death of Steel Serpent. Nu-An offers his sympathy to Lei Kung. Nu-An stated that Iron Fist has no plans to take over K'un-L'un.

Master Khan used the Jade Tiger to return to K'un-L'un with Power Man and Iron Fist hot on his trail. As Power Man and Iron Fist reach K'un-L'un, the archers there fired on Power Man and Iron Fist until Lei Kung told them to stand down and welcomed his former student and his ally into the city. Nu-An invited Power Man and Iron Fist to dinner where Nu-An explains the duel threats of the H'ylthri and the wolves proclaiming that Iron Fist would lead them to victory in this time of need. Iron Fist agreed to this under the condition that Nu-An tells him about his father. Lei Kung convinced Nu-An that it's time to tell him about his family. After the story was told, Lei Kung mentioned that perhaps Wendell has been returning to K'un-L'un to reclaim the throne that was rightfully his until Lord Tuan's death. Nu-An silenced Lei Kung and left. The next morning, Nu-An gave a lengthy speech to the warriors of K'un-L'un instructing them to fight valiantly against the H'ylthri. Following the victory, one of Nu-An's agents struck Iron Fist from behind and tied him to the Great Crystal as part of a sacrifice to Master Khan. Nu-An stated to Iron Fist that Master Khan was the god that was worshipped by the people of K'un-L'un who provided him with blood sacrifices. Nu-An mentioned that Shou-Lao had been the vessel for the sacrifices until Iron Fist had slayed him. As Nu-An raises the sacrificial blade in preparation for Iron Fist's sacrifice, Power Man and Lei Kung arrived to rescue Iron Fist. Power Man managed to shatter the sacrificial blade, knock aside Nu-An, and free Iron Fist. When Nu-An called for Master Khan for help, Master Khan summoned a ninja while Nu-An commanded his warriors to attack. Power Man and Iron Fist defeated their foes and forced Master Khan to open a portal that leads back to Earth. Nu-An was angered that Master Khan let Power Man and Iron Fist go back to Earth since he had promised their deaths. Master Khan silenced him stating that they spoke of his presumption later. Nu-An was helpless as Iron Fist shattered the Great Crystal which created the every-ten-year portals between Earth and K'un-L'un.

Master Khan and Nu-An were forced to flee K'un-L'un as Chiantang assaulted and leveled the city after learning about the death of Shou-Lao.

When Junzo Muto of the Hand kidnapped Misty Knight, Iron Fist came to Japan which triggered the transfer of K'un-L'un to Earth. The Dragon Kings told Nu-An that Junzo Muto's trainer Hiromotsu had slain Junzo's parents. Junzo Muto confronted Nu-An and the Dragon Kings telling them that they are now his to command. Nu-An had the Dragon Kings transform into a dragon to attack Junzo only for Hiromatsu to cast a spell that froze them in place and then cast a spell that made the Dragon Lords obey Junzo's every command. Of course Junzo kept Nu-An alive since he held some secrets to K'un-L'un. Iron Fist was knocked out by one of the Dragon Lords and thrown into the cell where Nu-An is held. When Junzo and Hiromatsu visited Iron Fist and Nu-An in their cell, Nu-An told Junzo that Hiromatsu was the one who killed his parents causing Junzo to kill Hiromatsu and usurp his powers. Iron Fist and Nu-An remained in their cell together. The spirits of Heather Duncan Rand appeared before Iron Fist telling him to remember that he still has a family. Seemingly talking to thin air, Iron Fist recounted their deaths as Iron Fist blames Nu-An who states that blood was thicker than water. When Wolverine arrived to free Iron Fist, he decided to let Nu-An come with them. Wolverine, Iron Fist, and Misty Knight protected Nu-An from various attacks from the Hand assassins. While Wolverine and Misty Knight fought the Hand, Iron Fist let Nu-An impale him with a spear in order to get K'un-L'un back to its dimension. Misty Knight then punched Nu-An as K'un-L'un and the Dragon Lords disappeared from Earth. The spirits of Wendell Rand, Heather Duncan Rand, and several other spirits of Feng-Tu resurrected Iron Fist after that.

Centuries ago as seen in the Avengers vs. X-Men storyline, Nu-An had a recurring dream associating a red-haired girl with the Phoenix and a dragon. He later finds a matching red-haired girl named Fongji in the streets of K'un-L'un and has her trained as the Iron Fist. In the present as Lei Kung reads this account, Nu-An tells him that those records have been sealed until the Phoenix returns and now he must teach Iron Fist what to do. Nu-An asks for Leonardo da Vinci to come to K'un-L'un in order to help protecting the world against the Phoenix's arrival. Meanwhile, Fongji is submitted to a hard trainment, eventually manifesting the Phoenix powers. Nu-An orders her to battle the dragon Shao-Lao as established by the ritual of the Iron Fist. Fongji is successful in her test and becomes the Iron Fist, shortly before Da Vinci sees the Phoenix coming towards Earth.

Powers and abilities
Nu-An has some degree of combat skills, but he shows minimal skills. Apparently, he is immune to aging due to him eating a fruit from the Tree of Immortality.

In other media
Yü-Ti (notable spelling difference) appears in the second season of Iron Fist played by James Saito. In flashback, he alongside Lei Kung and Priya watch Danny Rand and Davos fight for the right to face Shou-Lao. When Danny turns the tide against Davos and tries to get him to yield, Yü-Ti watched as Lei Kung stopped the fight by declaring that Danny will be the one to face Shao-Lao.

References

External links
 

Characters created by Gil Kane
Characters created by Roy Thomas
Comics characters introduced in 1974
Iron Fist (comics)
Marvel Comics male characters